Gököz is a village in the district of Keles, Bursa Province, Turkey. It is located northwest of the city of Bursa and south of Mount Uludağ.

The village has a unique dialect, customs, and traditions, as in the past centuries, it was a popular place for nomads breeding cattle that had lived in different regions between Turkmenistan and Mongolia to migrate to.

Notable residents 

 Müzeyyen Senar

References 

Villages in Bursa Province